Emmanuel Constant Edouard (Eduard) Colinet (12 December 1844 – 5 January 1890) was a Belgian sculptor.

Life and work
In 1874-1875, Colinet wrote the booklet Recueil Des Restes De Notre Art National - Verzameling der Overblijfsels onzer Nationale Kunst der XIste tot de XVIIIde Eeuw, which was regarded as a standard work on the period it describes. In 1877 he left his hometown of Brussels and became special supervisor under Pierre Cuypers during the construction of the Rijksmuseum in Amsterdam. In 1878 he oversaw Cuypers' restoration of the City Hall facade. Together with Cuypers he founded the Quellinusschool in Amsterdam. Colinet was also the first director of this school. In 1880, together with Cuypers and F. Stoltzenberg, he wrote Album van Ornamenten en Stijlproeven uit de verschillende Tijdperken der Bouwkunst ("Album of Ornaments and Style Tests from the Different Eras of Architecture").

Works

Sculptures
 Tomb Monument of Jan Albregt (1880) on De Nieuwe Ooster in Amsterdam, after a design by Charles Rochussen
 Gable stone of Pieter Corneliszoon Hooft placed above the latter's former house (1881), Keizersgracht, Amsterdam
 St Michel, terrassant le Dragon (1883). Made for Willem Albert Scholten, it has been in the Stadspark of Groningen since 1931.
 Statue of Mary on the facade of the town hall in Nijmegen. It was destroyed in World War II and replaced in 1953 by a statue of Albert Termote.

Publications 
 Verzameling der overblijfsels onzer nationale kunst der XIste tot de XVIIIde eeuw / E. Colinet; E. Loran. Liège: Claesen, vol.1 (1873) nr. 1-vol.3 (1876) nr. 17/18.
 Kunstvoorwerpen uit vroegere eeuwen / Éd. Colinet en A.D. de Vries Azn. Amsterdam: Wegner en Mattu, 1877. Catalog of the Exhibition of Applied Arts in Amsterdam, 1877.
 Catalogus der tentoonstelling van Kunstvoorwerpen in vroegere eeuwen uit edele metalen vervaardigd, gehouden door de maatschappĳ Arti et Amicitiae / samengest. by N. de Roever, A.D. de Vries and Ed. Colinet. Amsterdam: Van Munster, 1880. p. 306 
 Album van ornamenten en andere stylproeven uit de verschillende tĳdperken der bouwkunst - Album d'ornaments et autres détails des diverses époques de l'architecture, Amsterdam: Frederik Muller, 1880

References

1844 births
1890 deaths
19th-century Belgian sculptors
19th-century Belgian male artists
People from Mechelen